Maki Kureishi (1927 Calcutta – Karachi 1995) was a Pakistani poet.

She taught at the University of Karachi for 30 years.
She wrote in English.
Her nephew is Hanif Kureshi.

Works
"For My Grandson", Drunken Boat 10

Anthologies

References

External links
"Remembering Maki Kureishi (1927-1995)", Pakistan: The Journal of Commonwealth Literature, September 1996, 31: 109-121
"Pakistan", Pakistan Quarterly, Volume 17
Rāvī, Volume 70, Government College (Lahore, Pakistan), Gavarnmint Kālij. 1980

1927 births
1995 deaths
Writers from Kolkata
Muhajir people
English-language poets from Pakistan
Academic staff of the University of Karachi
Pakistani women academics
Pakistani women poets
20th-century women writers
20th-century Pakistani poets
20th-century Pakistani women writers